Andrzej Kubiak (born 25 January 1967) is a Polish wrestler. He competed in the men's freestyle 68 kg at the 1988 Summer Olympics.

References

1967 births
Living people
Polish male sport wrestlers
Olympic wrestlers of Poland
Wrestlers at the 1988 Summer Olympics
Sportspeople from Łódź